Frans Herman ten Bos (21 April 1937 – 1 September 2016) was a Scottish rugby union footballer.

Ten Bos attended Fettes College in Edinburgh, where he was introduced to the game, and later played for Oxford University RFC and London Scottish FC.

Ten Bos was controversially dropped before the Scotland- game in Dublin in 1960, because he was recovering from an injury. Yet according to Bill McLaren, "he took part in all the preparatory activities and pronounced himself as fit to play. He certainly gave it 100 per cent during a vigorous session." Yet  Alf Wilson, chairman of the selectors, did not think so, and he was replaced by Oliver Grant of Hawick. McLaren continues: "there was a feeling that ten Bos had been unfairly treated and that the lad himself was hurt and distressed by the decision to leave him out."

Notably, ten Bos scored a try against  in Cardiff, in the 1962 match there, which resulted in Scotland's first victory against Wales in an away game in thirty five years; the score was 8-3 to Scotland.

A famous story involving ten Bos and Hugh McLeod is told by Bill McLaren. Hugh McLeod took Ten Bos aside, and told him bluntly:
"Frans, ye think ye're a guid forrit [forward] but really ye're jist a big lump o' potted meat. If ah was half yer size I'd pick up the first two Frenchman that looked at me the morn [tomorrow] and ah'd chuck them right ower the bloody stand."

Scotland later won the game 11-6, rare for an away game.

Ten Bos tapped McLaren on the shoulder as they left the cafe, and said, "You know, I'd follow him anywhere."

He later became Chairman of Henderson Strata Investments.

He is profiled in the August, 1973 edition of Rugby World.

He died on 1 September 2016 at the age of 79.

References and sources

Printed and Electronic Sources
 McLaren, Bill Talking of Rugby (1991, Stanley Paul, London ),
 Massie, Allan A Portrait of Scottish Rugby (Polygon, Edinburgh)
 Distinguished Pupils on Fettes.com

Footnotes

1937 births
2016 deaths
Alumni of the University of Oxford
English people of Dutch descent
English rugby union players
London Scottish F.C. players
Oxford University RFC players
People educated at Lathallan School
People educated at Fettes College
Rugby union players from Richmond, London
Scotland international rugby union players
Scottish people of Dutch descent
Scottish rugby union players
Rugby union locks